Aberdeen (Lakota: Ablíla) is a city in and the county seat of Brown County, South Dakota, United States, located approximately  northeast of Pierre. The city population was 28,495 at the 2020 census, making it the third most populous city in the state after Sioux Falls and Rapid City. Aberdeen is the principal city of the Aberdeen Micropolitan Statistical Area, which includes all of Brown and Edmunds counties and has a population of 42,287 in 2020. Aberdeen is considered a college town, being the home of both Northern State University and Presentation College.

History

Settlement
Before Aberdeen or Brown County was inhabited by European settlers, it was inhabited by the Sioux Indians from approximately 1700 to 1879. Europeans entered the region for business, founding fur trading posts during the 1820s; these trading posts operated until the mid-1830s. The first "settlers" of this region were the Arikara Indians, but they would later be joined by others.

The first group of Euro-American settlers to reach the area that is now Brown County was a party of four people, three horses, two mules, fifteen cattle, and two wagons. This group of settlers was later joined by another group the following spring, and, eventually, more settlers migrated toward this general area, currently known as Columbia, South Dakota. This town was established on June 15, 1879, was settled in 1880, and was incorporated in 1882.

Creation of the town

Aberdeen, like many towns of the Midwest, was built around the newly developing railroad systems. Aberdeen was first officially plotted as a town site on January 3, 1881, by Charles Prior, the superintendent of the Minneapolis office of the Chicago, Milwaukee, and St. Paul Railroad, or the Milwaukee Road for short, which was presided over by Alexander Mitchell. Mitchell, Charles Prior's boss, was responsible for the choice of town names, was born in Aberdeen, Scotland, after which the town of Aberdeen, South Dakota, was named. Aberdeen was officially founded on July 6, 1881, the date of the first arrival of a Milwaukee Railroad train. Aberdeen then operated under a city charter granted by the Territorial Legislature in March 1883.

As Aberdeen grew, many businesses and buildings were constructed along Aberdeen's Main Street. However, this soon became a problem due to Aberdeen's periodic flooding, which led to it being referred to as "The Town in the Frog Pond". At first, this unique condition presented no problem to the newly constructed buildings because it had not rained very much but, when heavy rains fell, the Pond reappeared and flooded the basements of every building on Main Street, causing many business owners and home owners much turmoil. When this flooding happened, the city had one steam-powered pump that had to be used to dry out the entire area that had been flooded, which would take days, if not weeks – and more often than not, it would have rained again in this time period and caused even more flooding, even in the basements that had already been emptied of the water. When the water was gone from the basements, the city still had to deal with the mud that also resulted from the heavy rains.

The city decided in 1882 to build an artesian ditch to control the "Frog Pond" effects; the plan was later upgraded and developed into an artesian well in 1884 to combat the heavy rains and keep the basements from flooding. The artesian well was designed by the city engineers to prevent flooding and develop a water system. However, during the digging of the well, the water stream that was found underground was too powerful to be contained. The water came blasting out with violent force and had the entire Main Street submerged in up to four feet of water. The engineers realized the previous flaws of the artesian well plan and soon added a gate valve to the well to control the flow of water, giving Aberdeen its first working water supply.

Aberdeen had four different railroad companies with depots built in the newly developing town. With these four railroads intersecting here, Aberdeen soon became known as the "Hub City of the Dakotas". When looking down on Aberdeen from above, the railroad tracks converging in Aberdeen resembled the spokes of a wheel converging at a hub, hence the name "Hub City of the Dakotas". These four railroad companies are the reason why Aberdeen was able to grow and flourish as it did. The only railroad still running through Aberdeen is the BNSF Railway.

L. Frank Baum, who was later author of the book The Wizard of Oz and its many sequels, lived here with his wife and children for a few years in the early 1890s. He owned a store for over a year, which failed. He later published one of the city's then nine newspapers. The city's small amusement park has some features reflective of the Wizard of Oz series. After his sojourn in Aberdeen he moved to Chicago, Illinois in 1892.

1999 South Dakota Learjet crash

All on board died.

Geography
The James River enters northeastern South Dakota in Brown County, where it is dammed to form two reservoirs northeast of Aberdeen. The city is bisected by Moccasin Creek, a slow-moving waterway which flows south and then northeast to the James River.

Aberdeen has been assigned the ZIP code range 57401−57402.

Climate
Aberdeen experiences a humid continental climate (Köppen Dfb/Dfa) influenced by its position far from moderating bodies of water. This brings four distinct seasons, a phenomenon that is characterized by hot, relatively humid summers and cold, dry winters, and it lies in USDA Hardiness Zone 4b. Snowfall occurs mostly in light to moderate amounts during the winter, totaling . Precipitation, at  annually, is concentrated in the warmer months.

The National Oceanographic and Atmospheric Administration maintains a National Weather Service office in Aberdeen. Their area of responsibility includes northern and eastern South Dakota and two counties in west-central Minnesota.

Demographics

2010 census
At the 2010 census, there were 26,091 people, 11,418 households and 6,354 families residing in the city. The racial make-up was 91.8% White, 0.7% African American, 3.6% Native American, 1.3% Asian, 0.2% Pacific Islander, 0.5% from other races and 2.0% from two or more races. Hispanic or Latino of any race were 1.6% of the population.

There were 11,418 households, of which 27.1% had children under the age of 18 living with them, 42.1% were married couples living together, 9.5% had a female householder with no husband present, 4.0% had a male householder with no wife present, and 44.4% were non-families. 36.9% of all households were made up of individuals, and 13.1% had someone living alone who was 65 years of age or older. The average household size was 2.18 and the average family size was 2.86.

The median age  was 36.4 years. 22.2% of residents were under the age of 18; 12.8% were between the ages of 18 and 24; 24.1% were from 25 to 44; 24.4% were from 45 to 64; 16.4% were 65 years of age or older. The gender make-up of the city was 47.6% male and 52.4% female.

2000 census
At the 2000 census, there were 24,658 people, 10,553 households and 6,184 families residing in the city. The racial make-up of the city was 94.61% White, 0.37% Black or African American, 3.17% Native American, 0.54% Asian, 0.13% Pacific Islander, 0.19% from other races and 0.99% from two or more races. 0.79% of the population were Hispanic or Latino of any race. 53.7% were of German, 15% Norwegian and 8.5% Irish ancestry.

There were 10,553 households, of which 27.3% had children under the age of 18 living with them, 47.0% were married couples living together, 8.9% had a female householder with no husband present, and 41.4% were non-families. 34.9% of all households were made up of individuals, and 13.6% had someone living alone who was 65 years of age or older. The average household size was 2.21 and the average family size was 2.86.

21.8% of the population were under the age of 18, 14.1% from 18 to 24, 26.4% from 25 to 44, 20.4% from 45 to 64, and 17.2% were 65 years of age or older. The median age was 36 years. For every 100 females, there were 89.2 males. For every 100 females age 18 and over, there were 85.3 males.

The median household income was $33,276 and the median family income was $43,882. Males had a median income of $30,355 and females $20,092. The per capita income was $17,923. About 7.6% of families and 10.5% of the population were below the poverty line, including 10.6% of those under age 18 and 10.1% of those age 65 or over.

Religion
There are several Roman Catholic, Baptist, Lutheran, Methodist, Pentecostal, Church of Jesus Christ of Latter-day Saints churches in the area, as well as one synagogue.

Economy

Major employers

Super 8 Motels
Super 8 Motels was founded in 1972 by Dennis Brown and Ron Rivett as a motel referral system, which was replaced with a franchise operation in 1973. The first Super 8, with 60 rooms, was opened in 1974 in Aberdeen and still operates today as the Super 8 Aberdeen East.

Arts and culture

The Aberdeen Area Arts Council publishes a small monthly newspaper, ARTiFACTS, with information on area events.

The Aberdeen Community Theatre was created in 1979 and performs at the Capitol Theatre in downtown Aberdeen. The Capitol Theatre opened in 1927 and donated to the Aberdeen Community Theatre in 1991; since then more than $963,000 has been spent on renovating and preserving the historical aspect of the Capitol Theatre. Today, the Aberdeen Community Theatre performs five mainstage productions and three youth productions per year.

The South Dakota Film Festival established in 2007 is held annually in the fall. The festival has been host to Kevin Costner, Graham Greene, Adam Greenberg, CSA and many more stars of film and television. The festival's first feature film screened was Into The Wild, shot partially in SD. The festival is held at the historic Capitol Theatre.

The Northern State University Theater Department puts on plays during the school year.

There are four galleries in Aberdeen: Presentation College's Wein Gallery, Northern State University's Lincoln Gallery, the Aberdeen Recreation & Cultural Center (ARCC) Gallery and the ArtWorks Cooperative Gallery located in The Aberdeen Mall.

Sports

Bowling
The Village Bowl in Aberdeen is a modern bowling center with multiple lanes. Located at 1314 8th Ave NW.

Minor league baseball
Aberdeen has had three minor league baseball teams since 1920. The Aberdeen Boosters, a class D league team, played in 1920, the Aberdeen Grays, also a class D team, played from 1921 to 1923. The class C Aberdeen Pheasants from 1946 to 1971, and 1995 to 1997. The Pheasants were the affiliate of the former St. Louis Browns (and current Baltimore Orioles). Aberdeen was a stop to the majors for such notable players as Don Larsen (perfect game in the World Series), Lou Piniella (AL rookie of the year with Kansas City Royals in 1969), and Jim Palmer, Baseball Hall of Fame pitcher for the Baltimore Orioles.

Tennis
Aberdeen has 19 public tennis courts throughout the city – Melgaard Park (4), Northern State University (6), and Holgate Middle School (8).

Golf
Aberdeen has three golf courses: Lee Park Municipal Golf Course, Moccasin Creek Country Club and Rolling Hills Country Club. Lee Park and Moccasin Creek are both 18-hole courses. Rolling Hills is a combined nine-hole course and housing development which opened in 2005.

Hockey/ice skating
Aberdeen has several outdoor skating rinks and hockey rinks open to the public during winter months. Aberdeen is also home to the NAHL team, Aberdeen Wings.

Skateboarding/rollerblading
Aberdeen has a skate park located between East Melgaard Road and 17th Ave SE at Melgaard Park. The equipment installed includes a quarter pipe, penalty box with half pyramid, bank ramp, spine, kinked rail and a ground rail.

Disc golf
Aberdeen has two disc golf courses, Melgaard Park, and the Richmond Lake Disc Golf Course.

Roller Derby
Aberdeen has an All-women's Roller Derby league "A-Town Roller Girlz" established in 2011, also bringing Junior Roller Derby to the area. A men's league is to follow in the midst of interest in the dynamic of the sport.

Parks and recreation

Aberdeen Family YMCA
The full service YMCA includes an aquatic center with a competitive size lap pool, zero depth entry recreation pool with play features and hot tub.  There are three gyms one of which has a climbing wall.  There are two racquetball courts.  Saunas and steam rooms are in the men's and women's locker rooms.  Over 100 group fitness classes are offered each week with child watch available (short term childcare).  A wellness center that has cardio equipment, weight machines and free weights.

Family Aquatic Center
Completed in the summer of 2007, this complex includes a zero entry pool, competition lap pool, lazy river, numerous water slides, play sand area, and a concession area.

Wylie Park Recreation Area
Wylie Park Recreation Area features go-kart racing, sand volleyball courts, access to Wylie Lake, camping area, picnic areas, and is connected to Storybook Land. Wylie Lake is a small man-made lake, open in the summer months for swimming, lying on the beach, and paddle boating.

Storybook Land
Storybook Land is a park with attractions from several different children's storybooks. The park contains a castle, as well as a train that takes visitors through the park. There are two barns which contain petting zoos. Humpty Dumpty's Great Fall Roller Coaster was added to the park, summer 2015. Newly added is the Land of Oz, that features characters and attractions from L. Frank Baum's The Wonderful Wizard of Oz. Baum was a resident of Aberdeen in the 1880s. He left after a severe  drought led to the failure of first, his variety store Baum's Bazaar, and then his newspaper The Aberdeen Saturday Pioneer, where he wrote an opinion column, Our Landlady.

Kuhnert Arboretum
The Kuhnert Arboretum provides many new learning experiences for the residents of the Aberdeen area, including school-aged children. The Arboretum offers environmental education, a children's area, rose garden collection, recreational trails and much more.

Richmond Lake Recreation Area
The Richmond Lake Recreation Area is used by all types of outdoors enthusiasts. Three separate areas in this park cater to the needs of campers, swimmers, naturalists, boaters and anglers. Campers stay in the South Unit, while the  Forest Drive Unit is a great place for wildlife viewing. The Boat Ramp Unit provides access to the more than  lake.

Richmond Lake Recreation Area's small campground offers a quiet camping experience. The park also features a wheelchair accessible camping cabin.

Hikers, bikers, and horseback riders can observe the abundance of prairie plants and wildlife of the area up-close.

The park has multiple private and public boat ramps as well as an accessible fishing dock. Richmond Lake has a population of walleye, northern pike, bass, perch, crappie, bluegill, catfish, and bullheads within its waters. An entrance fee is required to gain access to the water and park itself.

Government
Aberdeen is the center of government for Brown County. City government is overseen by a mayor/city manager and eight council members. The city council is composed of Mayor Travis Schaunaman, City Manager Joe Gaa, and council members Dave Lunzman, Josh Rife, Mark Remily, Rob Ronayne, Alan Johnson, Tiffany Langer, Clint Rux and Justin Reinbold. Each council member serves a five-year term.

County government is overseen by five commissioners. Each county commissioner serves a five-year term. The county commissioners include Duane Sutton, Dennis Feickert, Mike Wiese, Rachel Kippley, and Doug Fjeldheim. Aberdeen is home to Brown County offices including clerk-magistrate, county auditor, landfill office, register of deeds, county treasurer, coroner, emergency management, highway superintendent, public welfare, state's attorney, and a few others.

The state senators from Brown County include Brock Greenfield and Al Novstrup, and the state representatives included Lana Greefield, Kaleb Wies, Carl Perry and Drew Dennert. They are all in office until December 2020

In 2008, Governor Mike Rounds named Aberdeen as the South Dakota Community of the Year.

Education

Public schools
Aberdeen Public Schools are part of the Aberdeen School District. The school district has six elementary schools, two middle schools, and one high school.

The elementary schools are C.C. Lee Elementary School, Lincoln Elementary School, May Overby Elementary School, O.M. Tiffany Elementary School, Simmons Elementary School and Mike Miller Elementary School. The two middle schools are Holgate Middle School, which serves the north side of Aberdeen, and Simmons Middle School, which serves the south side of the city. Students in the district attend Central High School. The Hub Area Technical School is located in the district. Aberdeen also has an alternative middle and high school.

The Aberdeen School District's enrollment for the year 2011–2012 was approximately 3,945 students, and the average class size was in the low to mid-twenties. Due to a projected increase in enrollment and the modernization of facilities, Simmons Middle School was completely remodeled with the demolition of the original 1929 building and the addition of a new classroom and cafeteria building which was completed in August 2008. The public school in Aberdeen is AA under the SDHSAA.

Parochial schools
Aberdeen has several parochial schools, including the Catholic-affiliated Roncalli High School, the nondenominational Aberdeen Christian School, and Trinity Lutheran School of the WELS.

Special programs
The South Dakota School for the Blind and Visually Impaired is a state special school under the direction of the South Dakota Board of Regents.

Higher education

Northern State University
Northern State University (NSU) is a public university that was founded in 1901 and today occupies a  campus. 2,528 students, ranging from first-year to graduate students, attended NSU for the 2006–2007 school year. The student to teacher ratio is 19:1.

NSU was originally called the Institute of South Dakota before changing its name to Northern Normal and Industrial School in 1901. It changed its name again in 1939 when it became the Northern State Teachers College, and again in 1964, becoming Northern State College before finalizing at Northern State University in 1989.

NSU offers thirty-eight majors and forty-two minors as well as other degrees, and also has nine graduate degree areas for students wishing to further their education after achieving their first degree.

The mascot of NSU is the wolf named Thunder.

Presentation College
Presentation College is a Catholic college on a  campus, and was founded in 1951. Enrollment in fall 2014 was reported to be 735. PC offers 26 programs between the main Aberdeen campus and the other campuses located throughout the state. Most of the degrees offered are in the health-care field. The student to teacher ratio is 12:1. Presentation's mascot is the Saint, giving it the nickname the Presentation College Saints.

Media
The American News was founded as a weekly newspaper in 1885, by C.W. Starling and Paul Ware. It is now a daily newspaper.

Television

AM radio

FM radio

Infrastructure

Transportation

Air
The Aberdeen Regional Airport is currently served by Delta Connection. It offers flights to Minneapolis-St. Paul International Airport using the Bombardier CRJ200 aircraft.

Roads
There are two major US highways that serve Aberdeen. One is US Highway 281, a north–south highway that runs continuously from the Canadian border to the Mexican border, the only three-digit U.S. highway to do so.  This also makes it the longest three-digit U.S. highway. The second highway is US Highway 12 that runs east–west across northern South Dakota from the Minnesota border before curving northwest into the southwestern corner of North Dakota. The western terminus is in Aberdeen, Washington, and the eastern terminus is in downtown Detroit, Michigan. US Highway 12 is the major thoroughfare in Aberdeen, and is signed in the city of Aberdeen as 6th Avenue South. US Highway 281 was recently realigned onto a new bypass that was constructed around the western area of the city.

Transit
Taxi

Aberdeen Taxi service provides general taxi service in Aberdeen. Aberdeen Shuttle provides shuttle service to and from the airport along with general taxi services.

Bus

Jefferson Lines is a bus service from Aberdeen that connects to Sioux Falls, South Dakota, Fargo, North Dakota, and Minneapolis, Minnesota.

Car rental

There are five car rental services in Aberdeen: Hertz, Avis, Dollar-Thrifty, Toyota Rent-a-Car and Nissan Rental Car. Hertz and Avis Car rental are located in the airport terminal. Dollar-Thrifty is located in Aberdeen Flying Service. Toyota Rent-a-Car and Nissan Rental Car are located at Harr Motors across from the airport.

Train

The BNSF Railway conveys freight and grain through Aberdeen. Until 1969 the Milwaukee Road ran trains between Aberdeen and Minneapolis. Earlier, until 1961, trains from Chicago to Seattle ran through the railroad's Aberdeen station. In addition, the Great Northern Railway and the Minneapolis and St. Louis Railway served Aberdeen at the GN station and the M&StL station respectively.

Healthcare
Aberdeen has two hospitals, Avera St. Luke's Hospital and Sanford Aberdeen Medical Center.

There are several nursing homes in the area, including Avera Mother Joseph Manor, Manor Care, Bethesda Home of Aberdeen, Aberdeen Health and Rehab, Angelhaus and Gellhaus Carehaus.

Notable people

 Josh Heupel Head Football Coach for the Tennessee Volunteers football team, former Head Football Coach for the UCF Knights football team, and Quarterback of the 2000 National Champion Oklahoma Sooners
 Don Meyer college basketball coach
 Michael Andrew, Olympic swimmer
 Bruce Baillie, experimental filmmaker, founding member of Canyon Cinema
 Sam Barry, Hall of Fame basketball, football and baseball coach
 L. Frank Baum, famous for his book The Wonderful Wizard of Oz
 Joshua Becker, minimalist writer
 Jerry Burke, organist for Lawrence Welk
 John Cacavas, Hollywood film score composer
 Emma Amelia Cranmer, temperance reformer, woman suffragist, writer
 Tom Daschle, former U.S. senator and Senate majority leader
 Drew Dennert, member of the South Dakota House of Representatives
 Justin Duchscherer, MLB pitcher for the Oakland Athletics
 Thomas Dunn, conductor who contributed to early music revival
 Makenzie Falcon, Miss South Dakota Teen USA 2016 and Top 15 semi-finalist at Miss Teen USA 2016
 Terry Francona, Cleveland Indians manager
 Matilda Joslyn Gage, suffragist, Native American activist, abolitionist, freethinker and author
 Hamlin Garland, author of the Middle Border series.
 Matt Guthmiller, Once the youngest person to circumnavigate the globe by air
 Mary GrandPré, illustrator
 Joseph Hansen, mystery writer
 Charles N. Herreid, Governor of South Dakota
 Ron Holgate, singer and actor
 Buel Hutchinson, lawyer and politician
 Saul Phillips college basketball coach
 Colton Iverson (born 1989), basketball player for Bàsquet Club Andorra
 David C. Jones, USAF general and former chairman of the Joint Chiefs of Staff
 Roland Loomis, key figure in the modern primitive movement
 Kenneth J. Meier, political scientist, Texas A&M University
 Paul Sather college basketball coach
 Julie Sommars, actress
 Eddie Spears, actor
 Michael Spears, actor
 Kaleb Weis, member of the South Dakota House of Representatives

Notes

References

External links

 City website
 Community website
 

 
Cities in South Dakota
Cities in Brown County, South Dakota
County seats in South Dakota
Populated places established in 1880
1880 establishments in Dakota Territory